John Lewis Gilbert III (born July 13, 1928) is an American show business personality who has worked mainly on television game shows. Originally a nightclub singer and entertainer, he has hosted and announced a number of game shows from various eras, dating as far back as the 1950s. He is known primarily for his work as the announcer and audience host for the syndicated version of the quiz show Jeopardy! since its revival in 1984.

Early life
Gilbert was born in Newport News, Virginia. He began performing by singing as a boy in his hometown Lutheran Church choir. Although his parents had never worked in the theatrical profession themselves, his grandmother had been a church singer.

While he was still in high school, Gilbert decided to take up a professional singing career and learned from an opera teacher. He never sang opera independently, but was the regular vocalist with Shelly Harmon and His Orchestra, a group that toured the Virginia area.

Career

Stage and early television career
A few years after graduating from high school, Gilbert resided in Florida for three months working as an emcee, during which he received on-the-job training, and learned to walk on stage, speak in front of a public crowd, and tell jokes and stories.

The Dead End Kids, a group comprising such young actors as Leo Gorcey, Huntz Hall, and Gabriel Dell, were organizing a revue. Gilbert joined the group and played throughout the southwestern United States for 16 weeks. When they played in Norfolk, Virginia, Gilbert got special billing.

In the 1950s, Gilbert joined the United States Army's Seventh Army Special Services in Germany, and was cast as the lead in Xanadu: The Marco Polo Musical, an original musical comedy inspired in part by the Samuel Taylor Coleridge poem Kubla Khan, which chronicles Marco Polo's trip to China. The company toured throughout Western Europe, performing for servicemen and civilians alike.

After resigning from the service and returning to the U.S., Gilbert continued singing and hosting in clubs. One day, a manager of a well-known group in Philadelphia asked Gilbert if he was interested in auditioning for television. He said yes, and received his first television assignment as a singer and emcee on WDSU in New Orleans.

Hosting
Gilbert went to New York City, where he quickly signed with the William Morris Agency and in 1958 received his first job on national television—as the host of a newly created game show, Music Bingo. The show ran for three years, airing first on NBC and then on ABC. His popularity on that show led him to record an album and several singles. Gilbert went on to emcee the local game show Words and Music on KTLA-TV in Los Angeles.

Gilbert was later contacted by Avco Broadcasting to host his own local talk/variety show, The Johnny Gilbert Show, which aired on WLWD-TV (now WDTN) in Dayton, Ohio, and three other Avco stations in Ohio and Indiana. The show was a 90-minute, live telecast running 5 days a week. It included celebrity guests and a 60-person studio audience. He hosted it for two years, until he left Dayton on short notice for New York, where he became the host of the Metromedia-produced game show Fast Draw. His slot was then given to Phil Donahue, who at that time was a reporter in WLWD-TV's news department.

After his yearlong run on Fast Draw, Gilbert was contacted by Bing Crosby Productions to host the game show Beat the Odds, produced in Los Angeles by Bill Carruthers. After that, he hosted a local, weekday version of Dialing for Dollars on Los Angeles's KCOP-TV.

Announcing 

In 1963, Gilbert was selected by Mark Goodson to replace Don Pardo as the announcer and audience host for the original Bill Cullen-hosted version of The Price Is Right when it moved from NBC to ABC. He hosted the show for the absent Cullen on June 19, 1964. Gilbert also served as the announcer and audience host for Dinah Shore's syndicated daily talk show, which ran from 1974 to 1980.

When Merv Griffin's quiz show Jeopardy! was reintroduced to television in 1984 as a daily syndicated program hosted by Alex Trebek, Trebek convinced Griffin to hire Gilbert as announcer; Trebek had met Gilbert at a dinner party in the early 1980s and was impressed with his voice. Gilbert has held the announcer role ever since. He has become well known for opening each of the show's nightly episodes with the announcement, "This is Jeopardy! " and (from 1984 until 2021) "...and now, here is the host of  Jeopardy!, Alex Trebek!" (Mike Richards in 2021 and Ken Jennings and Mayim Bialik since 2022). In 2017 Gilbert was honored by Guinness World Records for having the longest career as a game show announcer for a single show, after 32 years with Jeopardy! This was commemorated with a rare on-screen appearance by Gilbert just before the Final Jeopardy! segment of the episode aired September 28, 2017 (season #34, show #7599, Austin Rogers's 3rd win). He has also been the main announcer for most of the Jeopardy video games since 1992, including a few game versions in which he voiced all of the clues and effectively hosted the entire game off-screen in lieu of Trebek.
Gilbert briefly considered retirement after Trebek's death but chose to continue in the role. In recent years, Gilbert has handled much of his announcer load remotely, with a member of the Clue Crew providing in-studio announcements that are replaced with Gilbert's in post-production. Since the COVID-19 pandemic in 2020, Gilbert began doing his announcements in a studio built for him at his home.

In addition to announcing for Jeopardy!, Gilbert has worked as a guest announcer on its sister show, Wheel of Fortune. He announced on the episode that aired on April Fools' Day in 1997, as well as a few weeks of episodes in 2010 following the death of the show's longtime announcer, Charlie O'Donnell. Gilbert also guest announced on Wheel in late 1995, when O'Donnell was ill, and on the daytime show in 1988 before the death of then-regular announcer Jack Clark.

Other game shows for which Gilbert has announced over the decades include The $1,000,000 Chance of a Lifetime; The $25,000 Pyramid; The $100,000 Pyramid; Anything for Money; Blackout; Camouflage; Chain Reaction; Dream House; Every Second Counts; Fantasy; Go; Headline Chasers (produced by Griffin); Jackpot; Jeopardy! The Greatest of All Time; The Joker's Wild; Make Me Laugh; Perfect Match; Quiz Kids Challenge; Sports Challenge; Supermarket Sweep; Tic-Tac-Dough; Win, Lose or Draw; and Yours for a Song. He substituted for Gene Wood on several Goodson-Todman game shows, including Family Feud, the CBS version of Card Sharks, and Child's Play. He succeeded Rich Jeffries (another part-time substitute for Wood) as permanent announcer of Chuck Woolery's game show Love Connection during the 1988–89 season.

Other roles
Gilbert's voice was heard on the CBS television special Circus of the Stars, in People's Choice Awards and Emmy Awards ceremonies, and on episodes of the animated series The Angry Beavers and Johnny Bravo. He announced a fictional episode of Jeopardy! in the "Ellen's Energy Adventure" show at EPCOT Center's Universe of Energy attraction, and appeared in a subplot of the 1992 movie White Men Can't Jump in which a character played by Rosie Perez attempts to pass the Jeopardy! audition. Gilbert also lent his voice to an announcer in a 1989 episode of the TV series 227 and announced in The Golden Girls episode "Questions and Answers" (season 7, episode 17, on February 8, 1992) and in the Cheers episode "What Is... Cliff Clavin?" (season 8, episode 14, on January 18, 1990).

Personal life
Gilbert married his wife Sharee in 1984.

Filmography

Film

Television

Video games

References

External links
Johnny Gilbert's bio on the Jeopardy! website

1928 births
Living people
American game show hosts
Game show announcers
Musicians from Newport News, Virginia
American male singers
Singers from Virginia
Jeopardy!
Nightclub performers